Jacques Folch-Ribas (born November 4, 1928 in Barcelona, Spain) is a Canadian novelist and art critic from Quebec.

Born in Barcelona, Spain to Catalan parents, he grew up in France after his parents fled Francoist Spain in 1939. He studied mathematics, philosophy, urban planning and architecture at university, and worked for Le Corbusier, before moving to Montreal, where he became a Canadian citizen in 1961. In Montreal, he was a longtime art and literary critic for La Presse alongside his work as a novelist.

He won the Prix Québec-Paris in 1974 for Une aurore boréale, the Prix Molson in 1983 for Le Valet de plume, and the Governor General's Award for French-language fiction in 1988 for Le silence, ou Le parfait bonheur. He is a member of the Académie des lettres du Québec.

Works
La horde des Zamé (Le démolisseur) (1970)
Le greffon (1971)
Une aurore boréale (1974)
Le Valet de plume (1983)
La chair de pierre (1984)
Dehors, les chiens (1986)
Première nocturne (1991)
Marie Blanc (1993)
Homme de plaisir (1999)
Le silence, ou Le parfait bonheur (1999)
Des années, des mois, des jours (2001)
Les pélicans de Géorgie (2009)
Paco (2011)

References

1928 births
20th-century Canadian novelists
21st-century Canadian novelists
Canadian male novelists
Canadian male short story writers
Canadian novelists in French
Canadian art critics
Canadian literary critics
Writers from Barcelona
Spanish emigrants to Canada
Living people
Canadian male non-fiction writers
Spanish expatriates in France
Governor General's Award-winning fiction writers
20th-century Canadian male writers
21st-century Canadian male writers